Sergei Gennadyevich Breyev (born 22 April 1987) is a Russian former professional football player. He played as a defensive midfielder.

Club career
He made his Russian Premier League debut for FC Orenburg on 16 October 2016 in a game against FC Tom Tomsk.

References

External links
 
 

1987 births
People from Naberezhnye Chelny
Living people
Russian footballers
FC Tekstilshchik Kamyshin players
FC Rotor Volgograd players
FC KAMAZ Naberezhnye Chelny players
FC Khimki players
FC Orenburg players
FC Irtysh Omsk players
FC Avangard Kursk players
Russian Premier League players
Association football midfielders
Sportspeople from Tatarstan